Baymo is a settlement in the Tana River Primate National Reserve in Kenya's Tana River County.

References 

Populated places in Tana River County